The Jewish Infantry Brigade Group, more commonly known as the Jewish Brigade Group or Jewish Brigade, was a military formation of the British Army in the Second World War. It was formed in late 1944 and was recruited among Yishuv Jews from Mandatory Palestine and commanded by Anglo-Jewish officers. It served in the latter stages of the Italian Campaign, and was disbanded in 1946.

After the war, some members of the Brigade assisted Holocaust survivors to emigrate to Mandatory Palestine as part of Aliyah Bet, in defiance of British restrictions.

Background

Anglo-Zionist relations

After the First World War, the British and the French empires replaced the Ottoman Empire as the preeminent powers in the Middle East. This change brought closer the Zionist Movement's goal of creating a Jewish state. The Balfour Declaration indicated that the British Government supported the creation of a Jewish homeland in Palestine in principle, marking the first official support for Zionist aims. It led to a surge of Jewish emigration in 1918–1921, known as the "Third Aliyah". The League of Nations incorporated the Declaration in the British Mandate for Palestine in 1922. Jewish immigration continued through the 1920s and 1930s, and the Jewish population expanded by over 400,000 before the beginning of the Second World War.

In 1939, however, the British Government of Neville Chamberlain appeared to reject the Balfour Declaration in the White Paper of 1939, abandoning the idea of establishing a Jewish Dominion. When the United Kingdom declared war on Nazi Germany in September 1939, David Ben-Gurion, the head of the Jewish Agency, stated: "We will fight the White Paper as if there is no war, and fight the war as if there is no White Paper."

Origins of the Jewish Brigade
Chaim Weizmann, the President of the Zionist Organization (ZO), offered the British government full cooperation of the Jewish community in Mandatory Palestine. Weizmann sought to establish an identifiably Jewish fighting formation within the British Army. His request for a separate formation was rejected, but the British authorized the enlistment of Palestinian volunteers in the Royal Army Service Corps and in the Pioneer Corps, on condition that an equal number of Jews and Arabs was to be accepted. The Jewish Agency promptly scoured the local Labour Exchange offices to recruit enough Arab unemployed as "volunteers" to match the number of Jewish volunteers, and others were recruited from the lower strata of the Arab population offering cash bounties for enlistment. The quality of the recruits was, not surprisingly, abysmally low, with a very high desertion rate particularly among the Arab component, so that at the end most units ended up formed largely by Jews. The volunteers were formed in a RASC muleteers unit and a RASC Port Operating Company, and in the Pioneers Companies 601 to 609 (all but two lost during the Greece Campaign, with the last two returned to Palestine and disbanded there). From 1942, a large number of further Palestinian Arab/Jew mixed units were formed, still with the same mixed ethnic composition and the same quality problems encountered in the Pioneers Companies, including six RASC (Jewish) Transport Units, a women's Auxiliary Territorial Service and a Woman Territorial Air Force Service and several auxiliaries in local units of the Royal Army Ordnance Corps, Royal Engineers and Royal Army Medical Corps. Nine non-combat infantry companies were also raised as part of the Royal East Kent Regiment ("the Buffs"), to be used as guards for prisoners-of-war camps in Egypt. In August 1942 the Palestine Regiment was formed, again plagued by the same mixed recruiting and its associated low quality problems (the regiment was derisively called the "Five Piastre Regiments", due to the large number of Arab "volunteers" that had enlisted just for the cash bonus provided by the Jewish Agency).

However, there was no designated all-Jewish, combat-worthy formation. Jewish groups petitioned the British government to create such a force, but the British refused. At that time, the White Paper was in effect, limiting Jewish immigration and land purchases.

Some British officials opposed creating a Jewish fighting force, fearing that it could become the basis for Jewish rebellion against British rule. In August 1944, Winston Churchill finally agreed to the formation of a "Jewish Brigade". According to Rafael Medoff, Churchill consented because he was "moved by the slaughter of Hungarian Jewry [and] was hoping to impress American public opinion."

Jewish Brigade

Creation

After early reports of the Nazi atrocities of the Holocaust were made public by the Allied powers in the spring and early summer of 1942, British Prime Minister Winston Churchill sent a personal telegram to the US President Franklin D. Roosevelt suggesting that "the Jews... of all races have the right to strike at the Germans as a recognizable body." The president replied five days later saying: "I perceive no objection..."

After much hesitation, on July 3, 1944, the British government consented to the establishment of a Jewish Brigade with hand-picked Jewish and also non-Jewish senior officers. On 20 September 1944, an official communique by the War Office announced the formation of the Jewish Brigade Group of the British Army and the Jewish Brigade Group headquarters was established in Egypt at the end of September 1944 (the formation was styled a brigade group because of the inclusion under command of an artillery regiment). The Zionist flag was officially approved as its standard. It included more than 5,000 Jewish volunteers from Mandatory Palestine organized into three infantry battalions of the Palestine Regiment and several supporting units.
 1st Battalion, Palestine Regiment
 2nd Battalion, Palestine Regiment
 3rd Battalion, Palestine Regiment
 200th Field Regiment (Royal Artillery)

The New York Times quoted The Rev. Dr. Israel Goldstein that the British announcement of the creation of a Jewish Brigade "is a belated but nevertheless welcome token of recognition of the Jewish part in the war effort, particularly the contribution of Jewish Palestine." The Manchester Guardian lamented, "The announcement that a Jewish Brigade will fight with the British Army is welcome, if five years late. One regrets that the British Government has been so slow to seize a great opportunity."

Military engagements

In October 1944, under the leadership of Brigadier Ernest F. Benjamin, the brigade group was shipped to Italy and joined the British Eighth Army in November, which was engaged in the Italian Campaign under the 15th Army Group.

The Jewish Brigade took part in the Spring Offensive of 1945. It took positions on the front line for the first time on March 3, 1945 along the south bank of the Senio River, and immediately began engaging in small-scale actions against German forces, facing the 42nd Jäger Division and the 362nd Infantry Division. The brigade carried out aggressive patrolling during which it engaged in numerous firefights in order to improve its positions, clear the south bank of German troops, and take prisoners, and carried out small-scale raids against German positions across the river to test the enemy's strength and map out enemy defensive positions. In one notable raid, it was supported by tanks of the North Irish Horse and South African Air Force fighter aircraft. The South African pilots, many of whom were Jewish, flew in a Star of David formation during their attack run as a tribute to the brigade. During the raid, the brigade's infantrymen ran ahead of the tanks and mopped up the German positions, returning with prisoners and greatly impressing the seasoned troops of the North Irish Horse.<ref>Morris Beckman, The Jewish Brigade, Chapter 6</ref> The brigade first entered into major combat operations on March 19–20, 1945 at Alfonsine. In its first sustained action on March 19, the brigade killed 19 German soldiers and took 11 prisoner for the loss of 2 dead and 3 wounded in a series of clashes. The brigade then moved to the Senio River sector, where on March 27 it fought against elements of the German 4th Parachute Division commanded by Generalleutnant Heinrich Trettner. 

From April 1-9, the brigade again engaged the Germans in a series of small-scale clashes. It returned to offensive operations during the "Three Rivers Battle", crossing the Senio River on April 10 and capturing the two positions allocated to it, establishing a bridgehead and widening it the following day. It was assigned to clear out a German redoubt to the left of its position that another Allied unit had failed to capture. The brigade managed to complete the mission in a fierce battle, wiping out all enemy positions in fifteen minutes. It subsequently engaged in a series of small-scale clashes and captured Monte Ghebbio in a battle with German paratroopers. The brigade was then removed from the frontline for rest and refit before the liberation of Bologna (April 21, 1945). The brigade's engineering units also assisted in bridging the Po River to enable Allied forces to cross it. The Jewish Brigade spent 48 days on the frontline in Italy - March 3 to April 20, 1945.

The commander of the British 10th Corps praised the Jewish Brigade's performance:

The Jewish Brigade fought well and its men were eager to make contact with the enemy by any means available to them. Their staff work, their commands and their assessments were good. If they get enough help they certainly deserve to be part of any field force whatsoever.

There are indications that brigade members summarily executed surrendering German soldiers, particularly SS soldiers, in order to take revenge for the Holocaust. Although Brigadier Benjamin urged his troops not to kill surrendering Germans, emphasizing that intelligence gleaned from interrogation of prisoners would hasten the end of the war, he and his staff understood the desire for vengeance among the soldiers, and no Jewish Brigade soldier was ever punished for killing or otherwise mistreating surrendering enemy troops.

The Jewish Brigade was represented among the liberating Allied units at a papal audience. The Jewish Brigade was then stationed in Tarvisio, near the border triangle of Italy, Yugoslavia, and Austria. They searched for Holocaust survivors, provided survivors with aid, and assisted in their immigration to Palestine. They played a key role in the Berihah's efforts to help Jews escape Europe for British Mandatory Palestine, a role many of its members were to continue after the Brigade disbanded. Among its projects was the education and care of the Selvino children. In July 1945, the Brigade moved to Belgium and the Netherlands.

During the course of the Second World War, the Jewish Brigade suffered 83 killed in action or died of wounds and 200 wounded.  Its dead are buried in the Commonwealth's Ravenna War Cemetery at Piangipane.

Post-war deployment and disbandment

Tilhas Tizig Gesheften (commonly known by its initials TTG, loosely translated as "kiss [literally, lick] my arse business") was the name of a group of Jewish Brigade members formed immediately following the Second World War. Under the guise of British military activity, this group engaged in the assassination of Nazis, facilitated the illegal immigration of Holocaust survivors to Mandatory Palestine, and smuggled weaponry to the Haganah.

The Jewish Brigade also joined groups of Holocaust survivors in forming assassination squads known as the Nakam for the purpose of tracking down and killing former SS and Wehrmacht officers who had participated in atrocities against European Jews. Information regarding the whereabouts of these fugitives was gathered either by torturing imprisoned Nazis or by way of military connections. The British uniforms, military documentation, equipment, and vehicles used by Jewish Brigade veterans greatly contributed to the success of the Nokmim. The number of Nazis the Nokmim killed is unknown, but may have been as high as 1,500.Ian Black and Benny Morris: Israel's Secret Wars: A History of Israel's Intelligence Services, p. 188

After assignment to the VIII Corps District of the British Army of the Rhine (Schleswig-Holstein), the Jewish Brigade was disbanded in the summer of 1946.

Involvement in the Bricha

Many members of the Jewish Brigade assisted and encouraged the implementation of the Bricha. In the vital, chaotic months immediately before and after the German surrender, members of the Jewish Brigade supplied British Army uniforms and documents to Jewish civilians who were facilitating the illegal immigration of Holocaust survivors to Mandatory Palestine. The most notable example was Yehuda Arazi, code name "Alon," who had been wanted for two years by the British authorities in Palestine for stealing rifles from the British police and giving them to the Haganah. In 1945, Arazi and his partner Yitzhak Levy travelled from Mandatory Palestine to Egypt by train, dressed as sergeants from the Royal Engineers. From Egypt, the pair travelled through North Africa to Italy and, using false names, joined the Jewish Brigade, where Arazi secretly became responsible for organising illegal immigration. This included purchasing boats, establishing hachsharot, supplying food, and compiling lists of survivors.

When Arazi reached the Jewish Brigade in Tarvisio in June 1945, he informed some of the Haganah members serving in the Brigade that other units had made contact with Jewish survivors. Arazi impressed upon the Brigade their importance in Europe and urged the soldiers to find 5,000 Jewish survivors to bring to Mandatory Palestine. Jewish Brigade officer Aharon Hoter-Yishai recalled that he doubted the existence of 5,000 Jewish survivors; regardless, the Jewish Brigade accepted Arazi's challenge without question. For many Jewish soldiers, this new mission justified their previous service in the British forces that had preceded the creation of the Jewish Brigade.

Another Jewish Brigade soldier actively involved in the Bricha was Israel Carmi, who was discharged from the Jewish Brigade in the autumn of 1945. After a few months, the Secretariat of Kibbutz HaMeuchad approached Carmi about returning to Europe to assist with the Bricha. Carmi's previous experience working with survivors made him an important asset for the Bricha movement. He returned to Italy in 1946 and attended the 22nd Zionist Congress in Basel, where he gained insight into how the Berihah operated throughout Europe. Carmi proposed establishing a second Berihah route across Europe in case the existing route collapsed. In addition, he also proposed dividing the Bricha leadership into parts: Mordechai Surkis, working from Paris, would be responsible for the financial workings; Ephraim Dekel in Prague would run the administrative element, and oversee the Berihah in Poland, Czechoslovakia and Germany; and Carmi, working from Prague, would oversee activities in Hungary, Yugoslavia, and Romania.

Jewish Brigade soldiers, assisting with the Bricha, specifically took advantage of the chaotic situation in post-war Europe to move Holocaust survivors between countries and across borders. Soldiers were intentionally placed by Merkaz Lagolah at transfer points and border crossings to assist the Jewish DPs (displaced persons). For example, Judenberg, a sub-camp of the Mauthausen concentration camp, acted as a Berihah point where Brigade soldiers and partisans worked together to assist DPs. Similarly, in the city of Graz, a Bricha point was centred in a hotel where a legendary Bricha figure, Pinchas Zeitag, also known as Pini the Red or "Gingi," organised transports westwards to Italy. One of the Jewish Brigade's greatest contributions to the Bricha was the use of their British Army vehicles to transport survivors (up to a thousand people at a time) in truck convoys to Pontebba, the brigade's motor depot. These secret transports generally arrived at 2 or 3 a.m., and the Brigade always ensured that DPs were greeted by a soldier or an officer and welcomed into a dining hall with food and tea. Everyone was given a medical examination, a place to sleep, and clean clothing; and within a few days the group was moved to hachsharot in Bari, Bologna and Modena. After recuperating and completing their hachshara training, the DPs were taken to ports where boats would illegally set sail for Mandatory Palestine. Historians estimate that the Jewish Brigade assisted in the transfer, between 1945 and 1948, of 15,000–22,000 Jewish DPs as part of the Bricha and the illegal immigration movement.

Military legacy

In 1948, after the Israeli Declaration of Independence, many Jewish Brigade veterans served with distinction in the Israel Defense Forces during the 1948 Arab–Israeli War. Many veterans would serve as high-ranking officers in the Israeli military, 35 becoming generals.

Legacy
Medals and awards
thumb|7th armored Brigade Among the brigade's soldiers, 78 were mentioned in dispatches, and 20 received military decorations (7 Military Medals, 7 Order of the British Empire medals, 4 Military Crosses, and 2 US awards). Veterans of the Brigade were later entitled to the Volunteer Ribbon and the Fighters against Nazis Medal of the State of Israel. On 3 October 2018, after a unanimous support vote by the Italian Parliament, the war flag of the Jewish Brigade Group was awarded the Italian "Medaglia d'Oro al Valor Militare" for its contribution to the liberation of Italy during WW2. The medal was attached to the warflag of the Israeli 7th Armored Brigade, heirs of the Jewish Brigade Group, in a celebration at the Bet Hagdudim (Battalions Museum) in Avihayil.

Legacy
The Jewish Brigade inspired numerous memoires, books and films. In 1998, filmmakers Chuck Olin (Director) and Matthew Palm (Co-Producer) released their award-winning documentary, In Our Own Hands. The film aired on PBS in the United States and played in numerous film festivals around the world.

In popular culture
In Leon Uris novel Exodus, and the subsequent film, protagonist Ari Ben Canaan of the Haganah succeeds in organising the movement of refugees to Palestine, through his experience of action and use of procedures gained during the war as an officer of the Jewish Brigade.

Partial list of notable veterans of the Jewish Brigade
British Jews
 Ernest Benjamin
 Bernard M. Casper
 Edmund Leopold de Rothschild
Palestinian Jews

 Yehuda Amichai
 Meir Argov
 Ted Arison
 Hanoch Bartov
 Yehoshua Bar-Hillel
 Haim Ben-Asher
 Zvi Brenner
 Reuven Dafni
 Yehiel Duvdevani
 Israel Carmi
 Mordechai Gichon
 Amir Gilboa
 Elazar Granot
 Dov Gruner
 Hans Jonas
 Shraga Har-Gil
 Haim Laskov
 Mordechai Maklef
 Shimon Mazeh
 Nissan Nativ
 Yitzhak Orpaz
 David Rubinger
 Gideon Schocken
 Shlomo Shamir
 Chaim Sheba
 Mordechai Surkis
 Israel Tal
 Adin Talbar
 Moshe Tavor
 Yehoshafat Harkabi
 Aharon Hoter-Yishai
 Yigal Hurvitz
 Danny Matt
 Gideon Ben-Yisrael
 Meir Zorea
 Amram Zur
 Shalom Zysman

See also

 Fighters against Nazis Medal
 Jewish Legion
 Jewish Parachutists of Mandate Palestine
 Special Interrogation Group (SIG)
 The Sixth Battalion'' – a documentary about Jewish soldiers forced to fight for the Nazis in the Slovak Republic during the Second World War.
 Tilhas Tizig Gesheften, a paramilitary sister effort undertaken by many members of the brigade
 Volunteer Ribbon

References

Sources
 
 
 
  Contains a foreword by E F Benjamin former commander of the Jewish Brigade. Casper was Senior Chaplain to the Brigade.
 
 
 
 
 
  Shamir was the Jewish Brigade Commander on behalf of the Haganah and the Jewish Institutions in Palestine.

External links

 Combat and Resistance: Jewish Soldiers in the Allied Armies  on the Yad Vashem website
 Jewish Brigade Group (the United States Holocaust Memorial Museum)
 The Jewish Brigade (Israeli MFA)
 Chaim Weizmann on the Jewish Brigade, 1944  Shapell Manuscript Foundation
 Jewish Brigade Group (JVL)
 Chuck Olin Digital Film Archive (University of Illinois Library) (Digital video interviews from members of the Jewish Brigade)

 
Military units and formations established in 1944
Military units and formations disestablished in 1946
Brigades of the British Army in World War II
History of Mandatory Palestine
Jewish resistance during the Holocaust
Jewish military units and formations
Military units and formations of Mandatory Palestine in World War II
1944 establishments in Mandatory Palestine
1946 disestablishments in Mandatory Palestine